The 2012 WNBA season is the 13th season for the Seattle Storm of the Women's National Basketball Association.

Transactions

WNBA Draft
The following are the Storm's selections in the 2012 WNBA Draft.

Transaction log
April 11, 2011: The Storm acquired a second-round pick in the 2012 Draft from the Indiana Fever as part of the Katie Smith trade. In addition, the Storm traded a third-round pick to Indiana and a first-round pick to the Washington Mystics.
January 2: The Storm acquired the second overall pick in the 2012 Draft from the Chicago Sky as part of the Swin Cash trade. The storm sent the 23rd overall pick to Chicago.
January 31: The Storm re-signed Allie Quigley.
February 6: The Storm signed Ann Wauters.
February 9: The Storm re-signed Sue Bird and Tanisha Wright.
February 14: The Storm traded Ashley Robinson to the Washington Mystics in exchange for Victoria Dunlap.
February 15: The Storm re-signed Ewelina Kobryn and Katie Smith.
February 27: The Seattle Storm signed Tina Thompson.
March 9: The Storm signed Rachel Allison and Alysha Clark.
April 6: The Storm signed Silvia Dominguez.
April 12: The Storm signed Lindsay Taylor.
April 26: The Storm signed Jacqua Williams, Ashley Corral, Dellena Criner, Ashley Gayle, and draft pick Shekinna Stricklen.
May 1: The Storm waived Rachel Allison, Dellena Criner, and Jacqua Williams.
May 14: The Storm waived Ashley Gayle and Lindsay Taylor.
May 16: The Storm waived Ashley Corral and Allie Quigley.
June 26: The Storm waived Victoria Dunlap.
June 29: The Storm signed Svetlana Abrosimova.

Trades

Personnel changes

Additions

Subtractions

Roster

Depth

Season standings

Schedule

Preseason

|- align="center" bgcolor="ffbbbb"
| 1 || Fri 11 || 12:30 || @ Tulsa ||  || 60-86 || Dunlap (13) || Thompson (6) || Smith (3) || BOK Center  5,297 || 0-1
|- align="center" bgcolor="bbffbb"
| 2 || Sun 13 || 5:00 || Los Angeles ||  || 61-60 || Stricklen (15) || Thompson (5) || Wright (8) || KeyArena  4,628 || 1-1
|-

Regular season

|- align="center" bgcolor="ffbbbb"
| 1 || Fri 18 || 10:00 || Los Angeles || NBATVKONGKDOC || 66-72 || Wauters (17) || Thompson (8) || Bird (6) || KeyArena  9,686 || 0-1
|- align="center" bgcolor="ffbbbb"
| 2 || Tue 22 || 10:30 || @ Los Angeles || KONGKDOC || 61-74 || Wauters (15) || Wauters (8) || Bird (5) || Staples Center  9,238 || 0-2
|- align="center" bgcolor="ffbbbb"
| 3 || Sun 27 || 7:00 || @ Minnesota ||  || 71-84 || Wauters (13) || Wauters (9) || Bird (9) || Target Center  7,832 || 0-3
|-

|- align="center" bgcolor="bbffbb"
| 4 || Fri 1 || 10:00 || Tulsa ||  || 76-58 || Bird (27) || Little (9) || Wright (4) || KeyArena  7,489 || 1-3
|- align="center" bgcolor="ffbbbb"
| 5 || Sun 3 || 8:30 || @ Los Angeles || KONGKDOC || 65-67 || Smith (19) || Wauters (7) || Bird (6) || Staples Center  12,639 || 1-4
|- align="center" bgcolor="ffbbbb"
| 6 || Wed 6 || 8:00 || @ Minnesota ||  || 55-79 || Wright (14) || DunlapWauters (5) || BirdWright (3) || Target Center  8,263 || 1-5
|- align="center" bgcolor="ffbbbb"
| 7 || Sat 9 || 8:00 || @ San Antonio || FS-SW || 67-80 || Stricklen (14) || LittleStricklenWauters (8) || Wright (6) || AT&T Center  8,187 || 1-6
|- align="center" bgcolor="ffbbbb"
| 8 || Wed 13 || 8:00 || @ Chicago || CN100 || 58-74 || Thompson (13) || Wauters (8) || Bird (10) || Allstate Arena  4,681 || 1-7
|- align="center" bgcolor="bbffbb"
| 9 || Fri 15 || 8:00 || @ Tulsa ||  || 86-73 || Bird (21) || Bird (7) || Wright (7) || BOK Center  5,100 || 2-7
|- align="center" bgcolor="bbffbb"
| 10 || Sun 17 || 9:00 || Minnesota ||  || 65-62 || Bird (21) || SmithThompson (5) || Wright (8) || KeyArena  8,349 || 3-7
|- align="center" bgcolor="bbffbb"
| 11 || Fri 22 || 10:00 || San Antonio ||  || 82-76 || Wright (20) || Thompson (9) || Wright (7) || KeyArena  6,849 || 4-7
|- align="center" bgcolor="bbffbb"
| 12 || Sun 24 || 7:00 || Washington ||  || 72-55 || BirdWauters (14) || Wauters (7) || BirdWright (5) || KeyArena  6,979 || 5-7
|- align="center" bgcolor="bbffbb"
| 13 || Tue 26 || 7:00 || @ Washington || ESPN2 || 79-71 || Bird (25) || Wauters (7) || BirdLittle (3) || Verizon Center  6,645 || 6-7
|- align="center" bgcolor="ffbbbb"
| 14 || Sat 30 || 4:00 || @ New York || NBATV || 59-77 || ThompsonWauters (10) || Little (7) || Bird (4) || Prudential Center  6,724 || 6-8
|-

|- align="center" bgcolor="bbffbb"
| 15 || Sun 1 || 5:00 || @ Connecticut || CPTV-S || 89-83 (OT) || Little (27) || Little (9) || Bird (8) || Mohegan Sun Arena  9,201 || 7-8
|- align="center" bgcolor="ffbbbb"
| 16 || Sat 7 || 10:00 || @ Los Angeles || ESPN2 || 59-83 || Little (12) || Thompson (7) || Wright (8) || Staples Center  12,229 || 7-9
|- align="center" bgcolor="bbffbb"
| 17 || Sun 8 || 9:00 || Phoenix ||  || 83-68 || Bird (31) || Little (9) || Wright (5) || KeyArena  8,639 || 8-9
|- align="center" bgcolor="ffbbbb"
| 18 || Wed 11 || 3:00 || Atlanta ||  || 59-70 || Stricklen (16) || Stricklen (9) || Bird (8) || KeyArena  9,686 || 8-10
|- align="center" bgcolor="bbffbb"
| 19 || Fri 13 || 10:00 || @ Phoenix ||  || 83-64 || Smith (19) || Stricklen (11) || Bird (9) || US Airways Center  7,647 || 9-10
|-
| colspan="11" align="center" valign="middle" | Summer Olympic break
|-

|-
| colspan="11" align="center" valign="middle" | Summer Olympic break
|- align="center" bgcolor="bbffbb"
| 20 || Thu 16 || 10:00 || Phoenix || KONG || 72-58 || Little (17) || Little (6) || Wright (8) || KeyArena  6,987 || 10-10
|- align="center" bgcolor="ffbbbb"
| 21 || Sat 18 || 10:00 || Los Angeles || NBATVKDOC || 71-82 || Wright (21) || Clark (6) || Wright (4) || KeyArena  9,127 || 10-11
|- align="center" bgcolor="ffbbbb"
| 22 || Tue 21 || 10:00 || Minnesota || ESPN2 || 73-86 || Little (20) || LittleStricklen (5) || Bird (4) || KeyArena  6,169 || 10-12
|- align="center" bgcolor="ffbbbb"
| 23 || Thu 23 || 10:00 || Indiana ||  || 66-68 || Little (15) || Little (8) || Wright (5) || KeyArena  5,819 || 10-13
|- align="center" bgcolor="bbffbb"
| 24 || Sun 26 || 9:00 || New York ||  || 84-66 || Bird (18) || Little (8) || Bird (10) || KeyArena  6,459 || 11-13
|- align="center" bgcolor="ffbbbb"
| 25 || Thu 30 || 10:00 || Phoenix || KONG || 68-75 || Little (11) || Wright (8) || Bird (8) || KeyArena  6,379 || 11-14
|-

|- align="center" bgcolor="bbffbb"
| 26 || Thu 6 || 10:00 || Tulsa ||  || 101-74 || Jackson (23) || Stricklen (8) || Wright (8) || KeyArena  5,948 || 12-14
|- align="center" bgcolor="bbffbb"
| 27 || Sat 8 || 8:00 || @ Tulsa ||  || 89-66 || Little (28) || Little (9) || Wright (7) || BOK Center  7,415 || 13-14
|- align="center" bgcolor="ffbbbb"
| 28 || Tue 11 || 7:00 || @ Atlanta || NBATVFS-S || 61-77 || Jackson (14) || Jackson (9) || Bird (6) || Philips Arena  5,558 || 13-15
|- align="center" bgcolor="ffbbbb"
| 29 || Wed 12 || 7:00 || @ Indiana || NBATV || 48-72 || Abrosimova (11) || Jackson (10) || Smith (3) || Bankers Life Fieldhouse  6,337 || 13-16
|- align="center" bgcolor="ffbbbb"
| 30 || Fri 14 || 8:00 || @ San Antonio || NBATV || 66-90 || ThompsonWauters (12) || Wauters (9) || 4 players (4) || AT&T Center  7,109 || 13-17
|- align="center" bgcolor="ffbbbb"
| 31 || Sun 16 || 9:00 || Connecticut || KONGCPTV-S || 58-60 || Stricklen (12) || Smith (8) || Wright (8) || KeyArena  7,748 || 13-18
|- align="center" bgcolor="bbffbb"
| 32 || Tue 18 || 10:00 || Chicago ||  || 75-60 ||Wauters (16) || WautersStricklen (8) || Bird (8) || KeyArena  6,459 || 14-18
|- align="center" bgcolor="bbffbb"
| 33 || Fri 21 || 10:00 || San Antonio ||  || 84-75 || Smith (16) || Wauters (13) || Smith (6) || KeyArena  8,494 || 15-18
|- align="center" bgcolor="bbffbb"
| 34 || Sun 23 || 3:00 || @ Phoenix || ESPN2 || 71-57 || Little (14) || Little (8) || Smith (5) || US Airways Center  7,576 || 16-18
|-

| All games are viewable on WNBA LiveAccess or ESPN3.com

Postseason

|- align="center" bgcolor="ffbbbb"
| 1 || September 28 || 9:00 || @ Minnesota || ESPN2 || 70-78 || Stricklen (13) || StricklenThompson (7) || Wright (7) || Target Center  9,213 || 0-1
|- align="center" bgcolor="bbffbb"
| 2 || September 30 || 9:00 || Minnesota || ESPN || 86-79 (2OT) || Bird (22) || Jackson (14) || BirdWright (7) || KeyArena  8,479 || 1-1
|- align="center" bgcolor="ffbbbb"
| 3 || October 2 || 9:00 || @ Minnesota || ESPN2 || 72-73 || Bird (19) || Jackson (6) || Bird (11) || Target Center  8,023 || 1-2
|-

Statistics

Regular season

Awards and honors

References

External links

Seattle Storm seasons
Seattle
2012 in sports in Washington (state)
Seattle Storm